The Laws of the Indies are the entire body of laws issued by the Spanish Crown for the American and the Asian possessions of its empire. They regulated social, political, religious, and economic life in these areas. The laws are composed of myriad decrees issued over the centuries and the important laws of the 16th century, which attempted to regulate the interactions between the settlers and natives, such as the Laws of Burgos (1512) and the New Laws (1542). Throughout the 400 years of Spanish presence in these parts of the world, the laws were compiled several times, most notably in 1680 under Charles II in the Recopilación de las Leyes de los Reynos de las Indias (Compilation of the Laws of the Kingdoms of the Indies). This became considered the classic collection of the laws, although later laws superseded parts of it, and other compilations were issued.

History
The Spanish Viceroyalties in the Americas generated conflict between indigenous peoples ('Natives' or  'Indians') and the Spanish colonists. The Spanish attempted to control the Natives to force their labor. At the same time, conflicts on policy and implementation occurred between the encomenderos and the Crown.

Two of the main sets of laws issued in the 16th century regulated Spanish interaction with the Native peoples, an issue about which the Crown quickly became concerned soon after the voyages of Christopher Columbus and his governorship. The Laws of Burgos (1512), signed by King Ferdinand II of Aragon, focused upon the welfare of the conquered native peoples. The issue was revisited after Bartolomé de las Casas brought attention to abuses being carried out by encomenderos. The Laws of Burgos were revised by the New Laws of 1542 issued by Carlos I and quickly revised again in 1552, after the laws met resistance from colonists. These were followed by the Ordinances Concerning Discoveries in 1573, which forbade any unauthorized operations against independent Native Americans.

The Valladolid debate (1550–1551) was the first moral debate in European history to discuss the rights and treatment of a colonized people by colonizers. Held in the Colegio de San Gregorio, in the Spanish city of Valladolid, it was a moral and theological debate about the colonization of the Americas, its justification for the conversion to Catholicism and more specifically about the relations between the European settlers and the natives of the New World. It consisted of a number of opposing views about the way natives were to be integrated into colonial life, their conversion to Christianity and their rights and obligations. According to the French historian Jean Dumont, the Valladolid debate was a major turning point in world history, saying “In that moment in Spain appeared the dawn of the human rights”.

To guide and regularize the establishment of presidios (military towns), missions, and pueblos (civilian towns), King Phillip II developed the first version of the Laws of the Indies. This comprehensive guide was composed of 148 ordinances to aid colonists in locating, building, and populating settlements. These ordinances would be used throughout what is now called South America, Central America, Mexico, the US American West, and the Spanish East Indies.  They codified the city planning process and represented some of the first attempts at a general plan. Signed in 1573, the Laws of the Indies are considered the first wide-ranging guidelines towards design and development of communities. These laws were heavily influenced by Vitruvius' Ten Books of Architecture and Leon Battista Alberti's treatises on the subject.

Effects on town planning
In Book IV of the 1680 compilation of the Laws of the Indies, plans were set forth in detail on every facet of creating a community, including town planning. Examples of the range of rules include:

	Those [Colonists] who should want to make a commitment to building a new settlement in the form and manner already prescribed, be it of more or less than 30 vecinos (freemen), (know that) it should be of no less than twelve persons and be awarded the authorization and territory in accordance with the prescribed conditions.
	Having made the selection of the site where the town is to be built, it must, as already stated, be in an elevated and healthy location; [be] with means of fortification; [have] fertile soil and with plenty of land for farming and pasturage; have fuel, timber, and resources; [have] fresh water, a native population, ease of transport, access and exit; [and be] open to the north wind; and, if on the coast, due consideration should be paid to the quality of the harbor and that the sea does not lie to the south or west; and if possible not near lagoons or marshes in which poisonous animals and polluted air and water breed.
	They [Colonists] shall try as far as possible to have the buildings all of one type for the sake of the beauty of the town.
	Within the town, a commons shall be delimited, large enough that although the population may experience a rapid expansion, there will always be sufficient space where the people may go to for recreation and take their cattle to pasture without them making any damage.
 The site and building lots for slaughterhouses, fisheries, tanneries, and other business which produce filth shall be so placed that the filth can easily be disposed of.

These rules are part of a body of 148 regulations configuring any settlement according to the rule of Spain and its colonies. This continued as a precedent in all towns under Spanish control until the relinquishing of the land to others, as in the case of the American colonies and their growth. The Laws of the Indies are still used as an example to design guidelines for communities today.

The Laws specify many details of towns. A plan is made centered on a Plaza Mayor (main square) of size within specified limits, from which twelve straight streets are built in a rectilinear grid. The directions of the streets are chosen according to the prevailing winds, to protect the Plaza Mayor. The guidelines recommend a hospital for non-contagious cases near the church, and one for contagious diseases further away.

Most townships founded in any part of the Spanish Empire in America before the various parts became independent countries were planned according to the Laws. These include many townships with Spanish names located in what is now the United States. The creation of a central square and rectilinear grid of streets was different from the haphazard and organic growth that led to meandering streets in many old townships in Iberia.

See also
 Laws of Burgos
 New Laws
 Indian Reductions
 Jesuit Reductions
 Urban planning

References
Notes

Bibliography

 Spain/Council of the Indies and Juan Manzano Manzano. Recopilación de leyes de los reynos de las Indias. 4 vols. Madrid: Ediciones Cultura Hispánica, 1973 [1681] 
 Spain/Council of the Indies. Recopilación de leyes de los reynos de las Indias, 1681. 5 vols. Mexico: M. A. Porrúa, 1987.  
 Spain/Council of the Indies. Recopilación de leyes de los reynos de las Indias. 3 vols. Madrid: Centro de Estudios Políticos y Constitutionales: Boletín Oficial del Estado, 1998 [1681]. 
 Tyler, S. Lyman. The Indian Cause in the Spanish Laws of the Indies: With an Introduction and the First English Translation of Book VI, Concerning the Indians, from the Recopilación de leyes de los reinos de las Indias, Madrid, 1681. Salt Lake City: American West Center, University of Utah, 1980.
 Tyler, S. Lyman. Spanish Laws Concerning Discoveries, Pacifications, and Settlements among the Indians: With an Introduction and the First English Translation of the New Ordinances of Philip II, July 1573, and of Book IV of the Recopilación de leyes de los reinos de las Indias, Relating to these Subjects. Salt Lake City: American West Center, University of Utah, 1980.

External links
 Recopilación de las leyes de los reynos de Indias , links to PDF files, facsimile (non-searchable) version of the compilation on site of the Congress of the Republic of Peru.
 Recopilación de las leyes de los reynos de Indias , Microsoft Word .DOC format
 

Spanish colonization of the Americas
History of indigenous peoples of the Americas
Land use
Legal codes
Legal history of Spain
Urban planning by country
New Spain
Spanish East Indies
Spanish West Indies
Captaincy General of the Philippines
Latin American caste system